R. chinensis  may refer to:
 Rhus chinensis, a plant species found in China
 Rosa chinensis, the China rose, a plant species native to central China

See also
 Chinensis (disambiguation)